Malinghe River Bridge is a 241 metre high cable-stayed bridge near Xingyi, in the Guizhou province of China. , it is among the 50 highest bridges in the world. The bridge is located on G78 Shantou–Kunming Expressway and crosses the Maling River Canyon. The Maling River is a tributary of the Nanpan River.

See also
List of highest bridges in the world
Zhaozhuang Bridge

External links
https://web.archive.org/web/20120111011603/http://highestbridges.com/wiki/index.php?title=Malinghe_River_Bridge

Cable-stayed bridges in China
Bridges in Guizhou
Xingyi, Guizhou
Bridges completed in 2011